Daniel von der Bracke (born 28 January 1992) is a German footballer who plays as a centre-back for Oberliga Rheinland-Pfalz/Saar club TuS Koblenz.

Career

Von der Bracke began his career with Bayer Leverkusen, and made a couple of appearances for the reserve team in the 2010–11 season. In July 2011 he signed for VfL Osnabrück of the 3. Liga, and made his debut at this level in February 2012, as a substitute for Rouwen Hennings in a 2–0 win over 1. FC Saarbrücken. In July 2013 he signed for TSV Havelse.

Von der Bracke joined Goslarer Goslarer SC in July 2014.

References

External links

1992 births
Living people
German footballers
Germany youth international footballers
Bayer 04 Leverkusen II players
VfL Osnabrück players
TuS Koblenz players
3. Liga players
Regionalliga players
Association football defenders
TSV Havelse players
Sportspeople from Aachen
Footballers from North Rhine-Westphalia